Three Coins is a Sri Lankan beer brewed by McCallum Breweries (Ceylon) Ltd, a subsidiary of Cargills Ceylon PLC.

History
McCallum Brewery Limited was established in 1962 by the U. K. Edmund in Meegoda (a suburb of Colombo). In February 2011 Cargills Ceylon PLC acquired the McCallum Brewery via Cargill’s 100% owned subsidiary Millers Brewery Ltd for Rs. 1.425 billion. The Cargills Group subsequently spent Rs. 2 billion upgrading the brewery, increasing the capacity from 50,000hL/yr to 600,000hL/yr. In June 2014 it was reported that Cargills was preparing to sell Millers Brewery, the likely purchasers of the company include Distilleries Company of Sri Lanka PLC and Carson Cumberbatch PLC. In November 2014 it was announced that Lion Brewery had purchased Millers Brewery Limited from Cargills for Rs 5.15 billion and would commence the brewing of the Millers Brewery products at its facility in Biyagama, with production at the Meegoda plant ceasing temporarily pending further evaluation.

Varieties
 Three Coins – 4.8% ABV, an all-malt lager
 Sando Stout - 8.8% ABV, a stout made with Danish barley, Scottish malt and German hops. No longer in production.
 Three Coins Riva - 4.8% ABV, a Belgian style witbier. Launched in 2001, as a jointly branded product with Belgian brewers, Riva N.V., it was the first wheat beer brewed in Asia.
 Irish Dark - 7.5% ABV, an Irish-style ale. No longer in production.
 Irish Dark Red Ale - 4.5% ABV, an Irish-style ale.
 Grand Blonde - 8.8% ABV. Launched in 2009.
 Sando Power Strong - 8.8% ABV
Millers Brewery also brews Fosters under license from Carlton & United Breweries Ltd.

See also

References

External links
 Official Three Coins website

McCallum Breweries
Beer brands
McCallum Breweries
Sri Lankan brands